Winnie the Pooh and the Blustery Day is a 1968 American animated featurette based on the third, fifth, ninth, and tenth chapters of Winnie-the-Pooh and the second, eighth, and ninth chapters from The House at Pooh Corner by A. A. Milne. The featurette was directed by Wolfgang Reitherman, produced by Walt Disney Productions and released by Buena Vista Distribution Company on December 20, 1968 as a double feature with the live-action comedy feature The Horse in the Gray Flannel Suit. This was the second of the studio's Winnie the Pooh theatrical featurettes. It was later added as a segment to the 1977 film The Many Adventures of Winnie the Pooh. The music was written by Richard M. Sherman and Robert B. Sherman. It was notable for being the last Disney animated short to be produced by Walt Disney, who died of lung cancer on December 15, 1966, two years before its release.

It starred the voices of Sterling Holloway as Winnie the Pooh, Jon Walmsley as Christopher Robin (replaced Bruce Reitherman), Barbara Luddy as Kanga, Clint Howard as Roo, Paul Winchell as Tigger, Ralph Wright as Eeyore, Hal Smith as Owl, Howard Morris as Gopher, John Fiedler as Piglet, Junius Matthews as Rabbit, and Sebastian Cabot as the narrator.

Winnie the Pooh and the Blustery Day won the 1968 Academy Award for Best Animated Short Film. The Academy Award was awarded posthumously to Disney. This was also the only Winnie the Pooh production to ever win an Academy Award. (Winnie the Pooh and Tigger Too, which was released six years later in December 1974, was nominated for the same Academy Award, but lost to Closed Mondays.)

The animated featurette also served as an inspiration for the Many Adventures of Winnie the Pooh ride in the Disney theme parks in which the rider experiences several scenes from the cartoon, including Pooh's Heffalump and Woozle dream.

Sources
The film's plot is based primarily on seven A. A. Milne stories: "In which Eeyore finds the Wolery and Owl moves into it" (Chapter IX from The House at Pooh Corner) "In which Tigger comes to the forest and has breakfast" (Chapter II from The House at Pooh Corner), "In which Pooh & Piglet go hunting and nearly catch a Woozle" (Chapter III of Winnie the Pooh), "In which Piglet does a very grand thing" (Chapter VIII from The House at Pooh Corner), "In which Christopher Robin gives a Pooh Party and we say goodbye" (Chapter X of Winnie-the-Pooh) and "In which Piglet is entirely surrounded by water" (Chapter IX of Winnie-the-Pooh), with elements taken from "In which Piglet meets a Heffalump" (Chapter V from Winnie-the-Pooh: Winnie the Pooh's nightmare of Heffalumps and Woozles). In A. A. Milne's original story, Pooh shows more initiative during the flood, finding his way to Christopher Robin by riding on one of his floating honey pots, which he names The Floating Bear, then having the inspiration of using Christopher Robin's umbrella to carry them both to Piglet's house.

Plot
On a very windy day, Winnie the Pooh visits his "thoughtful spot". As Pooh sits thinking, Gopher pops out of the ground and advises him to leave as it is a "Winds-day". Misunderstanding Gopher's warning, Pooh goes across the Hundred Acre Wood to wish everyone a happy Winds-day. He arrives at the beech tree home of his good friend Piglet, who is nearly blown away while trying to rake leaves. Pooh grabs Piglet by his scarf, like the string of a kite. They pass by Kanga and Roo; Eeyore, whose stick house Pooh breaks as he passes; and Rabbit, whose carrots Pooh inadvertently helps harvest as he slides by.

The wind blows Pooh and Piglet to Owl's treehouse, where he invites them in. Pooh wishes Owl a happy Winds-day, as he has everyone else, but Owl informs them that the wind is due to "a mild spring zephyr". As Owl tells Pooh and Piglet some of the adventures of his relatives, the strong wind causes his tree to sway. It collapses, taking the house with it; Owl briefly suspects Pooh caused this. Christopher Robin and the others soon hear of the news and rush to the scene; as Owl's house is wrecked beyond the point of repair, Eeyore volunteers to seek out a new house for Owl, who proceeds to tell the others more stories for quite some time, boring them.

As night falls, the wind is still blowing, and Pooh is kept awake by noises outside. He opens his door for a visitor: a bouncing tiger named Tigger, who introduces himself with his signature song ("The Wonderful Thing About Tiggers") before stating that he has come looking for something to eat. Disgusted by the taste of Pooh's honey, Tigger tells him that there are Heffalumps and Woozles in the forest that steal honey before departing. Frightened by Tigger's words, Pooh stays up to guard his honey, but falls asleep as a thunderstorm brews. After he has a nightmare about Heffalumps and Woozles stealing his honey and chasing him around, Pooh wakes up in a flood caused by the storm.

In the flood, Piglet is washed away from his home in a floating chair, but not before he manages to write a message in a bottle for help. Pooh manages to escape to higher ground with ten honey pots, only to also be washed away by the rising waters. Kanga, Roo, Rabbit, and Tigger gather at Christopher Robin's house, the only place in the Hundred Acre Wood that isn't flooded, while Eeyore continues house hunting for Owl. Roo finds Piglet's bottle, and Owl flies off to tell Piglet that help is on the way.

Owl eventually finds Piglet as well as Pooh, but before he can inform them of the impending rescue – and tell another boring story – a waterfall threatens to carry them all over the side. Pooh switches places with Piglet as they take the plunge, and the waterfall washes them right into Christopher Robin's yard. Thinking that Pooh has rescued Piglet, Christopher Robin tells Pooh he is a hero. Once the flood has subsided, Christopher Robin throws a party for Pooh, where Eeyore announces he has found a new home for Owl. He leads everyone to his discovery which, known to everyone except Owl and Eeyore, is Piglet's house. Piglet generously lets Owl have his home, despite having nowhere else to live himself. Pooh then invites Piglet to move into his home, which Piglet happily accepts, and at Pooh's request, Christopher Robin declares the occasion a "two hero party".

Voice cast

 Sterling Holloway as Winnie the Pooh, an anthropomorphic bear who loves eating honey.
 Paul Winchell as Tigger, a tiger who loves to bounce on his tail.
 John Fiedler as Piglet, a small pig and Pooh's best friend who fears nearly everything.
 Clint Howard as Roo, Kanga's energetic young joey.
 Barbara Luddy as Kanga, a kangaroo and Roo's mother.
 Ralph Wright as Eeyore, an old grey donkey who is always losing his tail and talks in a slow and deep depressing voice.
 Hal Smith as Owl, an owl who loves to talk about his family.
 Junius Matthews as Rabbit, a rabbit who is obsessive-compulsive and loves planting his vegetables in his garden.
 Jon Walmsley as Christopher Robin, a 7-year-old boy and Pooh's human best friend.
 Howard Morris as Gopher, a hardworking gopher who lives underground and often falls into his hole.
 The Mellomen as the Singers
 Sebastian Cabot as Mr. Narrator

Production
Shortly before Walt Disney's death on December 15, 1966, the animation department was finishing work on The Jungle Book and preparing for The Aristocats. In late summer 1967, before The Aristocats went into production, it was decided to go ahead with a featurette-length sequel to Winnie the Pooh and the Honey Tree. Because The Honey Tree was popular with American audiences, it was decided Blustery Day would be the first animation project without Disney. Under the new circumstances, the "Nine Old Men" animators Frank Thomas, Ollie Johnston, and Milt Kahl were brought onto the project. Wolfgang Reitherman remained as director, but he decided to feel more faithful to the source material.

During a story meeting for the short, Disney considered Wally Boag to be perfect for the role of Tigger, who was added to the short. However, after Disney's death, Boag's performance of the character was considered to be "too zany for a children's film," and Paul Winchell, a ventriloquist, took the job instead. Following a British backlash to The Honey Tree led by film critic Felix Barker, Piglet was added to the short. For the part, Disney had heard John Fiedler's voice on television and selected him to voice the character. Although Fiedler's natural speaking voice was higher than most men's, he still had to raise it considerably to achieve the character's high pitch.

Release
In anticipation of the short's release, Los Angeles Mayor Sam Yorty proclaimed October 25, 1968 as "Winnie the Pooh Day". Starting from Disneyland, Pooh and several other characters made personal appearances in several Sears stores throughout 25 cities in the United States to help promote merchandise.

The film was released on December 20, 1968 in the United States, as a supplement to Disney's live-action comedy feature The Horse in the Gray Flannel Suit. It would later be included as a segment in The Many Adventures of Winnie the Pooh, which included the two other Pooh featurettes, released on March 11, 1977.

Like Winnie the Pooh and the Honey Tree, Blustery Day also had its television premiere on November 30, 1970 as a special on the NBC television network.  Like both specials, both Pooh specials ran throughout most of the 1970s and was sponsored by Sears, who was then the exclusive provider of Pooh merchandise. On March 5, 1989, the film was re-aired on NBC's Magical World of Disney.

Home media
The film was released on VHS and Betamax in 1986. It was re-released in 1989, 1991, 1993, 1994 and 1997, and on July 11, 2000 as part of the Storybook Classics Collection. This short also shows up as a bonus feature on the 2006 DVD release of Pooh's Grand Adventure: The Search for Christopher Robin.

It was also released on the Super 8mm film format by Derann in the early 2000s, making it one of the company's final and rarest films released, with only twelve copies made.

Music

All songs were written by Robert and Richard Sherman, who wrote most of the music for the Winnie-the-Pooh franchise over the years, subsequently incorporated into the 1977 musical film, The Many Adventures of Winnie the Pooh which is an amalgamation of the three previous Winnie-the-Pooh featurettes.
 
In advance of the featurette's release, Disneyland Records released several LP albums accompanied with a read-along book. The first one was titled Walt Disney Presents Winnie the Pooh and the Blustery Day and released in 1967. Sterling Holloway served as both the narrator and the voice of Pooh on the album. Distinctively from the featurette, Sam Edwards sang as Tigger.

Voice cast (in this Winnie the Pooh and the Blustery Day record)

 Sterling Holloway as Winnie the Pooh
 Sam Edwards as Tigger and Owl
 Robie Lester as Piglet and Roo
 Barbara Luddy as Kanga
 Thurl Ravenscroft as Eeyore
 Dallas McKennon as Rabbit and Gopher
 Jon Walmsley as Christopher Robin
 The Mellomen as the Singers

Winnie the Pooh featurettes
 Winnie the Pooh and the Honey Tree (1966)
 Winnie the Pooh and the Blustery Day (1968)
 Winnie the Pooh and Tigger Too (1974)
 Winnie the Pooh and a Day for Eeyore (1983)

See also
 List of American films of 1968

References

Bibliography

External links

 

1960s English-language films
1968 short films
Best Animated Short Academy Award winners
1960s musical drama films
1960s Disney animated short films
Short films with live action and animation
Winnie-the-Pooh featurettes
1968 animated films
Musicals by the Sherman Brothers
Animated films set in England
Animated musical films
Short films directed by Wolfgang Reitherman
Films produced by Walt Disney
Winnie the Pooh (franchise)
Films scored by Buddy Baker (composer)
American animated featurettes
1968 drama films
1960s children's animated films
Films about toys
Films with screenplays by Winston Hibler